In mathematics, the interplay between the Galois group G of a Galois extension L of a number field K, and the way the prime ideals P of the ring of integers OK factorise as products of prime ideals of OL, provides one of the richest parts of algebraic number theory. The splitting of prime ideals in Galois extensions is sometimes attributed to David Hilbert by calling it Hilbert theory. There is a geometric analogue, for ramified coverings of Riemann surfaces, which is simpler in that only one kind of subgroup of G need be considered, rather than two. This was certainly familiar before Hilbert.

Definitions 
Let L/K be a finite extension of number fields, and let OK and OL be the corresponding ring of integers of K and L, respectively, which are defined to be the integral closure of the integers Z in the field in question.
 
Finally, let p be a non-zero prime ideal in OK, or equivalently, a maximal ideal, so that the residue OK/p is a field.

From the basic theory of one-dimensional rings follows the existence of a unique decomposition
 

of the ideal pOL generated in OL by p into a product of distinct maximal ideals Pj, with multiplicities ej.

The field F = OK/p naturally embeds into Fj = OL/Pj for every j, the degree fj = [OL/Pj : OK/p] of this residue field extension is called inertia degree of Pj over p.

The multiplicity ej is called ramification index of Pj over p. If it is bigger than 1 for some j, the field extension L/K is called ramified at p (or we say that p ramifies in L, or that it is ramified in L). Otherwise, L/K is called unramified at p.  If this is the case then by the Chinese remainder theorem the quotient OL/pOL is a product of fields Fj. The extension L/K is ramified in exactly those primes that divide the relative discriminant, hence the extension is unramified in all but finitely many prime ideals.

Multiplicativity of ideal norm implies
 

If fj = ej = 1 for every j (and thus g = [L : K]), we say that p splits completely in L. If g = 1 and f1 = 1 (and so e1 = [L : K]), we say that p ramifies completely in L. Finally, if g = 1 and e1 = 1 (and so f1 = [L : K]), we say that p is inert in L.

The Galois situation
In the following, the extension L/K is assumed to be a Galois extension. Then the Galois group  acts transitively on the Pj. That is, the prime ideal factors of p in L form a single orbit under the automorphisms of L over K. From this and the unique factorisation theorem, it follows that f = fj and e = ej are independent of j; something that certainly need not be the case for extensions that are not Galois. The basic relations then read
 .
and
 
The relation above shows that [L : K]/ef equals the number g of prime factors of p in OL. By the orbit-stabilizer formula this number is also equal to |G|/|DPj| for every j, where DPj, the decomposition group of Pj, is the subgroup of elements of G sending a given Pj to itself. Since the degree of L/K and the order of G are equal by basic Galois theory, it follows that the order of the decomposition group DPj is  ef for every j.

This decomposition group contains a subgroup IPj, called inertia group of Pj, consisting of automorphisms of L/K that induce the identity automorphism on Fj. In other words, IPj is the kernel of reduction map . It can be shown that this map is surjective, and it follows that  is isomorphic to DPj/IPj and the order of the inertia group IPj is e.

The theory of the Frobenius element goes further, to identify an element of DPj/IPj for given j which corresponds to the Frobenius automorphism in the Galois group of the finite field extension Fj /F. In the unramified case the order of DPj is f and IPj is trivial. Also the Frobenius element is in this case an element of DPj (and thus also element of G).

In the geometric analogue, for complex manifolds or algebraic geometry over an algebraically closed field, the concepts of decomposition group and inertia group coincide. There, given a Galois ramified cover, all but finitely many points have the same number of preimages.

The splitting of primes in extensions that are not Galois may be studied by using a splitting field initially, i.e. a Galois extension that is somewhat larger. For example, cubic fields usually are 'regulated' by a degree 6 field containing them.

Example — the Gaussian integers 

This section describes the splitting of prime ideals in the field extension Q(i)/Q. That is, we take K = Q and L = Q(i), so OK is simply Z, and OL = Z[i] is the ring of Gaussian integers. Although this case is far from representative — after all, Z[i] has unique factorisation, and there aren't many quadratic fields with unique factorization — it exhibits many of the features of the theory.

Writing G for the Galois group of Q(i)/Q, and σ for the complex conjugation automorphism in G, there are three cases to consider.

The prime p = 2 

The prime 2 of Z ramifies in Z[i]:

The ramification index here is therefore e = 2. The residue field is

which is the finite field with two elements. The decomposition group must be equal to all of G, since there is only one prime of Z[i] above 2. The inertia group is also all of G, since

In fact, 2 is the only prime that ramifies in Z[i], since every prime that ramifies must divide the discriminant of Z[i], which is −4.

Primes p ≡ 1 mod 4 

Any prime p ≡ 1 mod 4 splits into two distinct prime ideals in Z[i]; this is a manifestation of Fermat's theorem on sums of two squares. For example:

The decomposition groups in this case are both the trivial group {1}; indeed the automorphism σ switches the two primes (2 + 3i) and (2 − 3i), so it cannot be in the decomposition group of either prime. The inertia group, being a subgroup of the decomposition group, is also the trivial group. There are two residue fields, one for each prime,

which are both isomorphic to the finite field with 13 elements. The Frobenius element is the trivial automorphism; this means that

for any integers a and b.

Primes p ≡ 3 mod 4 

Any prime p ≡ 3 mod 4 remains inert in Z[i]; that is, it does not split. For example, (7) remains prime in Z[i]. In this situation, the decomposition group is all of G, again because there is only one prime factor. However, this situation differs from the p = 2 case, because now σ does not act trivially on the residue field

which is the finite field with 72 = 49 elements. For example, the difference between 1 + i and σ(1 + i) = 1 − i  is  2i, which is certainly not divisible by 7. Therefore, the inertia group is the trivial group {1}. The Galois group of this residue field over the subfield Z/7Z has order 2, and is generated by the image of the Frobenius element. The Frobenius is none other than σ; this means that

for any integers a and b.

Summary

Computing the factorisation 

Suppose that we wish to determine the factorisation of a prime ideal P of OK into primes of OL. The following procedure (Neukirch, p. 47) solves this problem in many cases. The strategy is to select an integer θ in OL so that L is generated over K by θ (such a θ is guaranteed to exist by the primitive element theorem), and then to examine the minimal polynomial H(X) of θ over K; it is a monic polynomial with coefficients in OK. Reducing the coefficients of H(X) modulo P, we obtain a monic polynomial h(X) with coefficients in F, the (finite) residue field OK/P. Suppose that h(X) factorises in the polynomial ring F[X] as
 
where the hj are distinct monic irreducible polynomials in F[X]. Then, as long as P is not one of finitely many exceptional primes (the precise condition is described below), the factorisation of P has the following form:
 
where the Qj are distinct prime ideals of OL. Furthermore, the inertia degree of each Qj is equal to the degree of the corresponding polynomial hj, and there is an explicit formula for the Qj:
 
where hj denotes here a lifting of the polynomial hj to K[X].
   
In the Galois case, the inertia degrees are all equal, and the ramification indices e1 = ... = en are all equal.

The exceptional primes, for which the above result does not necessarily hold, are the ones not relatively prime to the conductor of the ring OK[θ]. The conductor is defined to be the ideal
 
it measures how far the order OK[θ] is from being the whole ring of integers (maximal order) OL.

A significant caveat is that there exist examples of L/K and P such that there is no available θ that satisfies the above hypotheses (see for example ). Therefore, the algorithm given above cannot be used to factor such P, and more sophisticated approaches must be used, such as that described in.

An example 

Consider again the case of the Gaussian integers. We take θ to be the imaginary unit i, with minimal polynomial H(X) = X2 + 1. Since Z[] is the whole ring of integers of Q(), the conductor is the unit ideal, so there are no exceptional primes.

For P = (2), we need to work in the field Z/(2)Z, which amounts to factorising the polynomial X2 + 1 modulo 2:
 
Therefore, there is only one prime factor, with inertia degree 1 and ramification index 2, and it is given by
 

The next case is for P = (p) for a prime p ≡ 3 mod 4. For concreteness we will take P = (7). The polynomial X2 + 1 is irreducible modulo 7. Therefore, there is only one prime factor, with inertia degree 2 and ramification index 1, and it is given by
 

The last case is P = (p) for a prime p ≡ 1 mod 4; we will again take P = (13). This time we have the factorisation
 
Therefore, there are two prime factors, both with inertia degree and ramification index 1. They are given by
 
and

See also 

 Chebotarev's density theorem

References

External links 
 
 
 

Algebraic number theory
Galois theory